Paid-in capital (also paid-up capital and contributed capital) is capital that is contributed to a corporation by investors by purchase of stock from the corporation, the primary market, not by purchase of stock in the open market from other stockholders (the secondary market). It includes share capital (capital stock) as well as additional paid-in capital.

The paid-in capital account does not reflect the amount of capital contributed by any specific investor.  Instead, it shows the aggregate amount of capital contributed by all investors.

However, the term has different definitions in different contexts. For example, it could refer to the money that a company gets from potential investors, in addition to the stated (nominal or par) value of the stock, which coincides with the definition of additional paid-in capital, or paid-in capital in excess of par. One should be aware of the use of the term and the abbreviation, which can confuse.

Basic concepts 
Paid-in Capital (a.k.a. Contributed Capital) = A + B :
 A = Share capital/Capital stock (Common stock plus Preferred stock)
 B = Additional paid-in capital (a.k.a. Paid-in capital in excess of par.)

Additional Paid-in Capital 
 Excess received from shareholders over the par value (or stated value) of the stock issued; also called contributed capital in excess of par.

 For example, if 1,000 shares of $10 par value common stock are issued by a corporation at a price of $12 per share, the additional paid-in capital is $2,000 (1,000 shares × $2). Additional paid-in capital is shown in the Shareholders' Equity section of the balance sheet.

See also 

 Share capital
 Capital surplus
 Preferred stock
 Treasury stock
 Reserve (accounting)
 Balance sheet

Financial capital